Zakaria bin Hanafi (born 4 March 1961) is a Malaysian politician who has served as Member of the Selangor State Legislative Assembly (MLA) for Semenyih since March 2019. He is a member of the United Malays National Organisation (UMNO), a component party of the Barisan Nasional (BN) coalition.

Election results

Selangor State Legislative Assembly

References

Living people
1961 births
Selangor politicians
Members of the Selangor State Legislative Assembly
United Malays National Organisation politicians